SwordSearcher is a Bible software package that runs on Windows.

History
SwordSearcher was originally written for DOS in 1994 by Brandon Staggs under the name Bible Assistant.  When Windows 95 was released, version 3 was released as a Windows program called SwordSearcher 95 and was apparently the first 32 bit Windows Bible Software available.

A port to the Mac OS was started  but was later canceled.

A SwordSearcher module compiler, called Forge, is available.

Reviews and awards
In 2007, 2008, and 2009, SwordSearcher was awarded the Shareware Industry Awards People's Choice for Best Hobby or Personal Interest software.

It is one of About.com's top 10 bible programs.

References

External links
 SwordSearcher.com - Official Webpage
 Jerry Foster SwordSearcher Review
 SonSpring SwordSearcher Review

Electronic Bibles